Raynor Winn (born 1962) is a British long-distance walker and writer; her first book The Salt Path was a Sunday Times bestseller in 2018. Winn and her husband Moth, who was diagnosed with corticobasal degeneration, became homeless after a business deal with a friend went wrong and decided to walk the  South West Coast Path.

The Salt Path was shortlisted for the 2018 Wainwright Prize, and the 2018 Costa Book Awards in the biography category. The judges described it as "An absolutely brilliant story that needs to be told about the human capacity to endure and keep putting one foot in front of another." In May 2019 The Salt Path won the inaugural RSL Christopher Bland Prize. In September 2019 it was the number one bestselling book in UK independent bookstores.

Winn also writes about nature, homelessness and wild camping. Her second book The Wild Silence was published by Michael Joseph (a subsidiary of Penguin Books) in September 2020. It was shortlisted for the 2021 Wainwright Prize for Nature Writing.

Winn's third book Landlines (2022) describes a  journey with her husband along the  Cape Wrath Trail in north-west Scotland, described as "the toughest and wildest Britain has to offer", and onwards through Scotland and England to the South West Coast Path.

Selected publications

References

External links

 Raynor Winn interviewed on the BBC's Woman's Hour radio programme 34:43 - 42:00 

Living people
21st-century British writers
Writers from Cornwall
1962 births
Walkers of the United Kingdom